The 1984 Milan–San Remo was the 75th edition of the Milan–San Remo cycle race and was held on 17 March 1984. The race started in Milan and finished in San Remo. The race was won by Francesco Moser of the Gis Gelati team.

General classification

References

1984
1984 in road cycling
1984 in Italian sport
March 1984 sports events in Europe
1984 Super Prestige Pernod